The Aranadan are Adivasi, a designated Scheduled Tribe in the Indian state of Kerala. They are an aboriginal tribe whose traditional way of life has been based on hunting and gathering.

References

Ethnic groups in India
Scheduled Tribes of India
Ethnic groups in Kerala
Indigenous peoples of South Asia